Guyana competed at the 2012 Summer Olympics in London, United Kingdom from 27 July to 12 August 2012. This was the nation's sixteenth appearance at the Olympics as an independent nation, although it had previously competed in five other games as British Guiana. Guyana did not compete in the 1976 Summer Olympics in Montreal because of its partial support to the African boycott.

The Guyana Olympic Association sent a total of six athletes to the Games, four men and two women, to compete in athletics, judo, and swimming. Track runner Aliann Pompey, who had competed at her fourth Olympic games, was the oldest athlete of the team, at age 34, while freestyle swimmer Brittany van Lange was the youngest at age 15, not only in the team, but also in its entire Olympic history. Another swimmer Niall Roberts, made his second Olympic appearance, having participated at the 2008 Summer Olympics in Beijing, along with Pompey.

Guyana failed to win a single Olympic medal since winning their first and only medal at the 1980 Summer Olympics in Moscow, where Michael Anthony won a bronze in boxing.

Athletics

Athletes from Guyana have so far achieved qualifying standards in the following athletics events (up to a maximum of 3 athletes in each event at the 'A' Standard, and 1 at the 'B' Standard):

 Key
 Note – Ranks given for track events are within the athlete's heat only
 Q = Qualified for the next round
 q = Qualified for the next round as a fastest loser or, in field events, by position without achieving the qualifying target
 NR = National record
 N/A = Round not applicable for the event
 Bye = Athlete not required to compete in round

Men

Women

Judo

Guyana has had 1 judoka invited.

Swimming

Guyana has had 2 swimmers selected.

Men

Women

See also
Guyana at the 2011 Pan American Games

References

External links

Nations at the 2012 Summer Olympics
2012
Olymp